Avanidhar Subrahmanyam is a professor and named chair at the University of California Los Angeles. He is an expert in stock market activity and behavioral finance, and has published a number of papers on financial markets.

Education
Subrahmanyam studied at the University of California, Los Angeles in the late 1980s. He graduated with a Ph.D. in finance in 1990.

Career
Subrahmanyam's career has operated primarily in the fields of finance and economics. He held the role of assistant professor at Columbia University from 1990 until 1993. After his role at Columbia, he became a visiting associate professor at the University of California in 1993 to 1994.

Subrahmanyam is mainly known for two academic contributions: The first is a behavioral (psychological) theory for the superior performance of value stocks and the phenomenon of stock market momentum. This contribution was adjudged to be the winner of the Smith Breeden prize for the best paper published in the Journal of Finance during 1998. The second contribution is to document that market liquidity exhibits systematic variation across stocks, just like returns, which led to a number of studies analyzing why trading costs fluctuate over time. This contribution won the Fama-DFA award for the best paper in Capital Markets in the Journal of Financial Economics for 2000.

In the press, Subrahmanyam discussed Apple Inc.'s stock price in 2013, when there was a spike in trading prices. Following it racing to a record high of over $700, the stock quickly fell to below $400 for the first time since 2011. Appearing on CNBC, Subrahmanyam stated that the activity was likely due to over exuberance on the upside can lead to herd-like behaviour. During the same year, he also commentated on the growth of the bitcoin currency. Subrahmanyam stated that he believed one of the biggest drawbacks of the crypto-currency was that merchants were not made to accept the currency, which leads to uncertainty in its everyday use.

His research and work has led him to be the author or co-author of numerous articles in refereed finance and economic journals. Recent research positions have ranged from the relationship between a company's stock and their cost of capital, while also studying theories on asset price behaviour and equity returns.

Research positions
Subrahmanyam is a founding co-editor and advisory editor for Elsevier's  The Journal of Financial Markets. He was previously an associate editor of The Review of Financial Studies and the Journal of Finance. Subrahmanyam has served as part of the Working Research Group on Market Microstructure at the National Bureau of Economic Research and on the organizing committee for the NBER annual conferences on market microstructure.

He has also served as a consultant to the UK Government Office for Science on stock market circuit breakers.

References

UCLA Anderson School of Management faculty
Living people
UCLA Anderson School of Management alumni
Columbia University faculty
Year of birth missing (living people)
Place of birth missing (living people)